Svenzea is a genus of sponges belonging to the family Scopalinidae, first described in 2002.

The species of this genus are found in Indonesia and Central America. The genus shows affinities with members of both Halichondrida and Haplosclerida but it is assigned to the family Dictyonellidae based on shared microanatomical and developmental features. The higher taxonomic position of Svenzea is a subject for future investigations.

Species:

Svenzea cristinae 
Svenzea devoogdae 
Svenzea flava 
Svenzea germanyanezi 
Svenzea tubulosa 
Svenzea zeai

References

Heteroscleromorpha
Sponge genera
Animals described in 2002
Taxa named by Rob van Soest